Alfredo Tinoco (born 13 March 1934 in Villa Carbon, Baja California Sur) is a Mexican former middle-distance runner who competed in the 1960 Summer Olympics.

References

1934 births
Living people
Sportspeople from Baja California Sur
Mexican male middle-distance runners
Mexican male steeplechase runners
Olympic athletes of Mexico
Athletes (track and field) at the 1960 Summer Olympics
Pan American Games medalists in athletics (track and field)
Athletes (track and field) at the 1959 Pan American Games
Pan American Games bronze medalists for Mexico
Central American and Caribbean Games gold medalists for Mexico
Competitors at the 1959 Central American and Caribbean Games
Central American and Caribbean Games medalists in athletics
Medalists at the 1959 Pan American Games
20th-century Mexican people